The World Qoroltai of the Bashkirs (The World Kurultai of the Bashkirs)  — international Union of Public Organizations, designed to meet the challenges of unification, ethnic and cultural development and renewal Bashkirs. Headquartered in Bashkortostan in Ufa.

Goals
Upholding the cultural identity of the Bashkirs in conditions of increasing globalization
Maintaining and enhancing the quality of teaching of the Bashkir language
Countering attempts to distort the history of the Bashkir people and the role of prominent figures
Spiritual and moral and patriotic education of youth
Adapting to the established multi-ethnic society representatives of the people, who had not previously inhabited Bashkortostan
Development of international cooperation in the sphere of national policy

History 
The tradition of Bashkirs to gather for kurultay or iyiyn to discuss the most important issues and solutions to pressing problems is rooted in the deep past. It is documented that Kurultai  were still in place in the years 1556-1557, when they deliberated the question of voluntary inclusion of Bashkortostan into Russia. After the agreement on the conditions of entry into Russia, its results have been approved by iyiyn birth.

After a series of Bashkir rebellions, which were mostly decided in Kurultai, the tsarist government in order to end the unrest in Bashkortostan banned the gathering of iyiyny.

I The World Qoroltai of the Bashkirs

II The World Qoroltai of the Bashkirs

III The World Qoroltai of the Bashkirs

IV The World Qoroltai of the Bashkirs
IV The World Qoroltai of the Bashkirs was held on 19–21 November 2015 in Ufa. Bashkir Wikipedia significance was particularly emphasized at the event.

The measures undertaken 
Days Bashkir kutsltury in cities and regions of Russia and the world. 
Konkurss "A sober Village"

References

Links 

 official website MSOO "World kurultay Bashkir"
 Kurultaj Bashkirs
 Kurultaj in Bashkortostan: a brief encyclopedia
 II World kurultay Bashkirs
 History vsebashkirskih kurultays

Organizations based in Bashkortostan